Government Polytechnic, Hisar is a public funded college located in  Hisar in the Indian state of Haryana.

Location
It Main highway on New  Delhi road.

Details 
The college offers 365 seats in 3 years diploma courses in Mechanical Engineering (120 seats), Electronics & Communications Engineering (64 seats), Computer Engineering (120 seats), Textile Technology (64 seats), Textile Processing (63 seats), Textile Design (63 seats) and Instrumentation & Control Engineering (44 seats).

See also 
 List of Universities and Colleges in Hisar
 List of schools in Hisar
 List of institutions of higher education in Haryana

External links 
  Official website

References 

Universities and colleges in Hisar (city)